This is a list of every Alabama Crimson Tide football team quarterback and the years they participated on the Alabama Crimson Tide football team.
Alabama quarterbacks have played prominent roles in American society off the gridiron as well. Both Farley Moody and Charlie Joplin died while serving in the First World War.

Starting quarterbacks

1933 to present
The following players were the starting quarterbacks for the Crimson Tide each season since joining the Southeastern Conference in 1933.

1922 to 1932 

The following players were the predominant quarterbacks for the Crimson Tide each season after the establishment of the Southern Conference until the establishment of the Southeastern Conference.

1895 to 1921

The following players were the predominant quarterbacks for the Crimson Tide each season after the establishment of the Southern Intercollegiate Athletic Association until the establishment of the Southern Conference.

1892 to 1894
The following players were the predominant quarterbacks for the Crimson Tide each season the team was a non-conference independent, following the birth of Alabama football.

References

Alabama Crimson Tide

Alabama Crimson Tide quarterbacks